The Committee of Estates governed Scotland during the Wars of the Three Kingdoms (1638–1651) when the Parliament of Scotland was not sitting. It was dominated by Covenanters of which the most influential faction was that of the Earl of Argyll.

The Committee derives its name from the "Estates of Scotland" which was an alternative name for the Parliament of Scotland (see the Three Estates of Scotland).

References

Covenanters
Political history of Scotland
Wars of the Three Kingdoms
17th century in Scotland
Parliament of Scotland
Religion and politics
Government of Scotland